Melting Millions is a 1927 American adventure film serial directed by Spencer Gordon Bennet. It is considered to be lost.

Cast
 Allene Ray as Judy Winslow
 Walter Miller as Lieutenant Palmer
 E. H. Calvert
 William Norton Bailey
 Eugenia Gilbert
 Frank Lackteen
 John J. Richardson
 George Kuwa
 Albert Roccardi
 Bob Burns (as Robert Burns)
 John Cossar
 Ernie Adams
 Richard Travers (as Richard C. Travers)

See also
 List of film serials
 List of film serials by studio

References

External links

1927 films
1927 adventure films
American silent serial films
American black-and-white films
Films directed by Spencer Gordon Bennet
Lost American films
Pathé Exchange film serials
American adventure films
1927 lost films
Lost adventure films
1920s American films
Silent adventure films